Swinhay House is a futuristic building built for David McMurtry, an industrialist, in North Nibley near Wotton-under-Edge, Gloucestershire.

History
McMurtry bought a  piece of land and forest in North Nibley near Wotton-under-Edge, Gloucestershire. David Austin designed a modern-day eco-friendly country manor and in 2000 acquired PPG 7 planning permission for it as a "Millennium House", under guidance that allowed for the creation of houses of exceptional architectural interest within the green belt.

Although the house is complete and operational, McMurty and his family do not live in it. Instead it is used to host charitable causes, and rented out to fashion photographers and film makers. The home was used in the final episode of the third series of BBC One's Sherlock, as the home of nemesis Charles Augustus Magnussen; the fee for its use was donated to charity.

References

External links
Swinhay House at David Austin
Swinhay House at Swinhay Ltd

Country houses in Gloucestershire
Houses completed in the 21st century
High-tech architecture